Gignac is a commune in the Vaucluse department in the Provence-Alpes-Côte d'Azur region in southeastern France. Chateau d'Autet lies to the northeast of the village. A beautifully restored 18th century chateau and official historical landmark, the Chateau de Gignac, sits atop a hill overlooking the hamlet of Gignac. An earlier chateau at this location was damaged in 1575 during the French Wars of Religion, and was rebuilt between 1760 and 1780 on the eve of the French Revolution.

See also
Communes of the Vaucluse department

References

Communes of Vaucluse